Gresham is a station on the Rock Island District Metra line, which runs between Joliet, Illinois and LaSalle Street Station in downtown Chicago, Illinois. It is in zone B according to Metra fee schedules based on its  distance from downtown Chicago. As of 2018, Gresham is the 142nd busiest of Metra's 236 non-downtown stations, with an average of 313 weekday boardings. It is in the community area of Auburn Gresham, on the south side of Chicago. The Rock Island service splits just south of here; most trains travel west over the Suburban Line (via Brainerd), while some rush-hour trains head south for Blue Island on the main line (via Longwood). 

As of 2022, Gresham is served by 20 trains in each direction on weekdays, by 10 inbound trains and 11 outbound trains on Saturdays, and by eight trains in each direction on Sundays.

Although Gresham is situated north of the split between the main line and Beverly branch, the station is served only by trains that run on the Beverly branch. Trains that run on the main line are currently scheduled to bypass it.

Gresham Station is built on an embankment between bridges over West 87th Street and Vincennes Avenue. Parking is mainly street-side, and there are parking lots on the corner of Vincennes Avenue and Halsted Street, and on Genoa Avenue between 88th and 87th Street.

Bus connections
CTA
 8A South Halsted
 24 Wentworth
 87 87th 
 N87 87th (Owl Service)

References

External links

87th Street entrance from Google Maps Street View
86th Street entrance from Google Maps Street View

Metra stations in Chicago